A spaser or plasmonic laser is a type of laser which aims to confine light at a subwavelength scale far below Rayleigh's diffraction limit of light, by storing some of the light energy in electron oscillations called surface plasmon polaritons. The phenomenon was first described by David J. Bergman and Mark Stockman in 2003. The word spaser is an acronym for "surface plasmon amplification by stimulated emission of radiation".  The first such devices were announced in 2009 by three groups: a 44-nanometer-diameter nanoparticle with a gold core surrounded by a dyed silica gain medium created by researchers from Purdue, Norfolk State and Cornell universities, a nanowire on a silver screen by a Berkeley group, and a semiconductor layer of 90 nm surrounded by silver pumped electrically by groups at the Eindhoven University of Technology and at Arizona State University. While the Purdue-Norfolk State-Cornell team demonstrated the confined plasmonic mode, the Berkeley team and the Eindhoven-Arizona State team demonstrated lasing in the so-called plasmonic gap mode. In 2018, a team from Northwestern University demonstrated a tunable nanolaser that can preserve its high mode quality by exploiting hybrid quadrupole plasmons as an optical feedback mechanism.

The spaser is a proposed nanoscale source of optical fields that is being investigated in a number of leading laboratories around the world. Spasers could find a wide range of applications, including nanoscale lithography, fabrication of ultra-fast photonic nano circuits, single-molecule biochemical sensing, and microscopy.

From Nature Photonics:

Study of the quantum mechanical model of the spaser suggests that it should be possible to manufacture a spasing device analogous in function to the MOSFET transistor, but this has not yet been experimentally verified.

See also
Polariton laser
Nanolaser
Surface-enhanced Raman spectroscopy
List of plasma physics articles

References

Further reading
 

Condensed matter physics
Laser types
Nanoelectronics
Plasmonics